Aras Vydunas Baskauskas (Lithuanian: Baškauskas) (born September 26, 1981) is an American yogi, musician, and reality TV personality who won Survivor: Panama and competed in Survivor: Blood vs. Water. He releases his music under the name Odd Us.

Early life
Of Lithuanian origin, Baskauskas earned a bachelor of arts degree in philosophy from the University of California, Irvine in 2003, then went on to an MBA in business administration at that school. While there, he played NCAA Division I basketball. After college, he briefly played basketball in Lithuania, and later moved to Cape Town, South Africa where he opened a yoga studio. He went on to become a yoga instructor in Santa Monica, California.

Survivor

Panama
In Survivor: Panama — Exile Island, Baskauskas was originally part of the Viveros tribe of younger men, until a tribal swap early on had him become a member of the Casaya tribe, where he formed an early alliance with Shane Powers, Courtney Marit and Danielle DiLorenzo. When the tribes merged, the former Casaya tribe members (himself, Powers, Marit, DiLorenzo, Bruce Kenagai, and Cirie Fields) had a number advantage against the four former La Mina tribe members. The former Casaya members proceeded to vote out the entire former La Mina tribe, excluding Terry Deitz, who won nearly all of the immunity challenges. When the alliance had nowhere left to turn but on each other, Baskauskas and Powers targeted DiLorenzo, but she, Marit, and Deitz wanted to vote out Baskauskas. Not happy with any of these options, Fields brewed a plan of her own, and together with Baskauskas and DiLorenzo, voted out Marit, followed by Powers. At the final four challenge, Baskauskas won immunity. Dietz, due to the widely known fact that he possessed the hidden immunity idol, was also safe. This created a 2–2 tie between DiLorenzo and Fields, who competed in a fire-building challenge to determine their fate. DiLorenzo won the challenge and Fields was eliminated.

At the final immunity challenge, DiLorenzo out-balanced the two men to win immunity, giving her the power to choose her opponent for the Final Two. DiLorenzo eventually chose to eliminate Dietz, making him the final member of the jury and propelling Baskauskas into the Final Two. On Day 39, while he and DiLorenzo walked on the rocks by the ocean, Baskauskas slipped on a wet rock and fell, sending shards of glass into his hand and back. His wounds required stitches by the medical crew, but no medical evacuation. In the end, Baskauskas beat out DiLorenzo to become the Sole Survivor in a 5–2 vote, gaining the votes of Austin Carty, Sally Schumann, Marit, Fields and Deitz.

Blood vs. Water
Baskauskas returned for the show's 27th season, Survivor: Blood vs. Water, alongside his older brother, Vytas. After a tribe swap, Aras was placed on the new Tadhana tribe, alongside fellow returning players Tyson Apostol and Gervase Peterson, as well as newcomers Hayden Moss, Caleb Bankston, and Ciera Eastin. Due to his performance in Panama, as well as the fact that he was the only tribe member who still had a loved one left in the game, Apostol rallied all the other tribe members into an alliance to eliminate Aras in 11th place, making him the tenth person eliminated from Survivor: Blood vs. Water, and the first member of the jury. Shortly afterwards, the merge came and Apostol's alliance also eliminated Vytas in 10th place. In the final tribal council, Aras cast his vote for Apostol to win the $1 million prize, while Vytas was the sole jury member to cast his vote for someone other than Apostol, instead voting for Monica Culpepper.

Filmography

Music career
In 2011, Baskauskas released his debut album, The Tree and the River, under the stage name of "Odd Us".

Business ventures
In 2013 Baskauskas and his partner, Christy Baskauskas (née Petersen), founded clothing brand Christy Dawn.

Personal life
In 2015, Baskauskas married his girlfriend of four years, Christy Petersen. Christy is a model and clothing designer, and gave birth to their first child on May 29, 2014. They announced the birth of their son, River, via Instagram.

References

External links 
 Aras and Vytas Baskauskas biography for Survivor: Blood vs. Water at CBS.com

1981 births
American people of Lithuanian descent
American yoga teachers
Living people
People from Venice, Los Angeles
Place of birth missing (living people)
Survivor (American TV series) winners
Television personalities from California
UC Irvine Anteaters men's basketball players
American men's basketball players
Winners in the Survivor franchise